Rasyid Assyahid Bakri (born in Gowa, Indonesia, 17 January 1991) is an Indonesian professional footballer who plays as a midfielder for Liga 1 club PSM Makassar. In 2005, he played in Danone Nations Cup with Makassar Football School.

International career
Bakri made his first international caps for Indonesia in a match against Singapore in the 2012 AFF Championship as substitute.

Career statistics

International

Honours

International
Indonesia U-23
Islamic Solidarity Games  Silver medal: 2013

Club
PSM Makassar
 Piala Indonesia: 2019

Individual
 Indonesia Soccer Championship A Best XI: 2016

References

External links 
 
 

1991 births
Living people
Bugis people
Sportspeople from South Sulawesi
Indonesian footballers
PSM Makassar players
Liga 1 (Indonesia) players
Indonesian Premier League players
Indonesia youth international footballers
Indonesia international footballers
Footballers at the 2014 Asian Games
People from Gowa Regency
Association football midfielders
Asian Games competitors for Indonesia